Fort Drum is a U.S. Army military reservation and a census-designated place (CDP) in Jefferson County, on the northern border of New York, United States. The population of the CDP portion of the base was 12,955 at the 2010 census. It is home to the 10th Mountain Division.

Its mission includes command of active component units assigned to the installation, providing administrative and logistical support to tenant units, support to active and reserve units from all services in training at Fort Drum, and planning and support for the mobilization and training of almost 80,000 troops annually.

History
This section of the article incorporates text taken from a public-domain document prepared by the United States military.

A portion of the present Fort Drum was first used as a military training site in 1908 when it was named Pine Camp; the following year land was purchased to develop the camp as an installation. The army had an earlier presence in the North Country from the early 19th century, prior to the War of 1812.

In 1809 the United States stationed a company of infantry soldiers at what was then called Sackett's Harbor to enforce the Embargo Act and control smuggling between northern New York and Canada, particularly Kingston, Ontario. Following the outbreak of the War of 1812, Sacketts Harbor became the center of United States naval and military activity for the Upper St. Lawrence River valley and Lake Ontario. A major shipyard was developed there and twelve warships were completed. The town was rapidly flooded with troops and some 3,000 skilled workers for the navy shipyard, most of whom came from New York City.

During the 1830s and 1840s, the Lower Canada Rebellion in Canada prompted a new round of military preparations. The United States purchased land in Sackets Harbor (as it is now spelled), where it developed Madison Barracks, a base for artillery units.

Pine Camp
In 1908, Major General Frederick Dent Grant was sent to the Pine Camp region to train with 2,000 regulars and 8,000 militia. Grant, the son of Ulysses S. Grant, former United States president and Civil War general, found Pine Plains to be ideal for military exercises. In 1909 the military allocated funds to purchase land to form Pine Camp, and summer training continued here through the years.

The camp came into the national spotlight in 1935, when the largest peacetime maneuvers ever were held on Pine Plains and surrounding farm lands. Approximately 36,500 soldiers came from throughout the Northeast to take part in the exercise. Some soldiers traveled by trains, which arrived in town every 15 minutes, coming from as far away as Buffalo, New York and New York City. For 36 hours, young men from offices, factories, and farms marched, attacked and defended in tactical exercises on the  the army had leased for its war games. The maneuvers were judged to be most successful and the War Department purchased an additional  of land.

LeRay Mansion

The LeRay Mansion, built in the early 19th century, was named after James LeRay de Chaumont. Throughout the years the mansion served as a post commander's quarters, visiting dignitaries' quarters and a location for formal military receptions. Today the mansion is used to house high ranking visitors, which has encouraged the continued upkeep of the mansion. The LeRay Mansion is listed on the National Register of Historic Places.

World War II expansion
With the outbreak of World War II in Europe, Pine Camp was selected by the Army for a major expansion. An additional  of land was purchased, displacing 525 local families. Five entire villages were eliminated, while others were reduced from one-third to one-half their size. Three thousand buildings, including 24 schools, six churches and a post office, were abandoned.

By Labor Day 1941, 100 tracts of land were taken over. Contractors went to work, and in a period of 10 months at a cost of $20 million, an entire city was built to house the divisions scheduled to train at Pine Camp.

Eight hundred buildings were constructed, including 240 barracks, 84 mess halls, 86 storehouses, 58 warehouses, 27 officers' quarters, 22 headquarters buildings, and 99 recreational buildings, as well as guardhouses and a hospital. Construction workers suffered during this period, as the winter of 1941-42 was one of the coldest in North Country history.

The three divisions to train at Pine Camp included the 4th Armored Division (Gen. Creighton Abrams was a battalion commander there at the time), the 45th Infantry Division (United States), and the 5th Armored Division.

During the war, the post also served as a prisoner of war camp for captured Italian and German troops. Some were allowed to work on area farms during their internment. Of prisoners who died here, one Italian and six Germans are buried in the Sheepfold Cemetery near Remington Pond.

Pine Camp was renamed as Camp Drum in 1951, named after Lieutenant General Hugh A. Drum, who was chief of staff of the First United States Army during World War I and First Army commander at the start of World War II. During and after the Korean War, a number of units were stationed and trained here to take advantage of the terrain and climate.

Several communities at or near Agent Orange manufacturing or storage sites continue to report dioxin levels above recommended safety standards, including Fort Drum. The material was used extensively during the Vietnam War for defoliation.

Renamed Fort Drum and after
In 1974, a permanent garrison was assigned and Camp Drum was renamed Fort Drum. In April 1980, B Company, 76th Engineer Battalion (Combat Heavy) was reassigned from Fort Meade, Maryland. Three years later the rest of the battalion was transferred here, with the exception of D Company.

On September 11, 1984, the announcement was made that Fort Drum would be the new home of the 10th Light Infantry Division. Its mission is to be manned and trained to deploy rapidly by air, sea, and land anywhere in the world, prepared to fight upon arrival and win. The first of the division's troops arrived at Fort Drum on December 3, 1984, and the unit was officially activated on February 13, 1985. The name was changed to the 10th Mountain Division (Light Infantry) at that time. The division reached full strength in 1989.

Between 1986 and 1992, 130 new buildings,  of roads, and 4,272 sets of family quarters were built at a cost of $1.3 billion.

On June 4, 1985, the identity of a roundout brigade was announced that would be composed of Army National Guard battalions. Units from the New York Army National Guard from central and northern New York under the 27th Infantry Brigade made the roundout brigade.

On June 28, 1985, the 76th Engineer Battalion was inactivated.

In 2013 Fort Drum was being considered for the location of a proposed Eastern United States missile defense site.

In 2014, a 60-megawatt biofuel power plant was established to provide energy for the base, part of the U.S. military's push for renewable energy and self-sufficiency.

In 2015, Diana M. Holland was promoted to become the first woman general at Fort Drum, and the first woman to serve as a deputy commanding general in one of the Army's light infantry divisions (specifically, the 10th Mountain Division.)

Current units

 10th Mountain Division
 1st Brigade Combat Team, 10th Mountain Division
 2d Brigade Combat Team, 10th Mountain Division
 Combat Aviation Brigade, 10th Mountain Division
 10th Mountain Division Artillery, 10th Mountain Division
 10th Mountain Division Sustainment Brigade
 American Red Cross (ARC)
 U.S. Army Materiel Command FSC (LAO)
 Wheeler-Sack Army Airfield
 20th Air Support Operations Squadron (United States Air Force)
 Air Force Weather, 20th Air Support Operations Squadron (20th ASOS)
 Fort Drum Criminal Investigation Command (CID)
 Non-commissioned Officers Academy
 Naval Reserve Center - Fort Drum
 1st Battalion (Infantry), 314th Regiment; 2d Battalion (Logistics Support), 313th Regiment; and 3d Battalion (Field Artillery), 314th Regiment (all under the 174th Infantry Brigade, previously known as 2d Brigade, 78th Division Training Support, now stationed at Fort Dix)
 7th Legal Support Organization (7th LSO)
 725th Ordnance Company (EOD)
 174th Fighter Wing Air-Ground Gunnery Range
 1215th Garrison Support Unit (USAR)
 Guthrie Ambulatory Health Care Clinic
 U.S. Air Ambulance Detachment
 760th Ordnance Company (EOD)
 63d Ordnance Battalion (EOD)
 91st Military Police Battalion
 7th Engineer Battalion
 630th Engineer Company (Route Clearance)
 642d Engineer Company (Support)
 Company B (Field Maintenance), 427th Brigade Support Battalion, 27th Infantry Brigade Combat Team, New York Army National Guard (NYARNG); 
 1427th Transportation Company (Medium Truck), 53rd Troop Command, NYARNG; 
 Company C, Recruiting and Retention Command, NYARNG; 
 Maneuver Area Training Equipment Site (NY MATES), NYARNG.
 925th Contracting Battalion.

Geography

The military reservation occupies a large tract in the eastern part of Jefferson County, including parts of the towns of Antwerp, Leray, Philadelphia, and Wilna. The reservation also extends east into the town of Diana in Lewis County. Several villages in Jefferson County are on the border of Fort Drum: Antwerp, Black River, Carthage, Evans Mills, Natural Bridge, and Philadelphia. The nearest city is Watertown,  to the southwest, which is the service and shopping destination for the fort's personnel.

The Indian and Black rivers flow along part of the reservation boundary.

Demographics

As of the census of 2000, there were 12,123 people, 2,253 households, and 2,203 families residing in the CDP. The population density was 479.8 per square mile (185.2/km2). There were 2,280 housing units at an average density of 90.2/sq mi (34.8/km2). The racial makeup of the CDP was 64.2% White, 19.8% African American, 0.8% Native American, 2.4% Asian, 0.7% Pacific Islander, 7.6% from other races, and 4.5% from two or more races. Hispanic or Latino of any race were 13.3% of the population.

There were 2,253 households, of which 75.3% had children under the age of 18 living with them, 91.9% were married couples living together, 4.3% had a female householder with no husband present, and 2.2% were non-families.  Of all households, 2.0% were made up of individuals, and none had someone living alone who was 65 years of age or older. The average household size was 3.33 and the average family size was 3.36.

In the CDP, the population was spread out, with 24.9% under the age of 18, 37.5% from 18 to 24, 36.0% from 25 to 44, 1.5% from 45 to 64, and 0.1% who were 65 years of age or older. The median age was 22 years. For every 100 females, there were 186.9 males. For every 100 females age 18 and over, there were 235.4 males.

The median income for a household in the CDP was $31,699, and the median income for a family was $31,202. Males had a median income of $19,779 versus $19,401 for females. The per capita income for the CDP was $13,395. About 6.3% of families and 6.2% of the population were below the poverty line, including 6.8% of those under age 18 and none of those age 65 or over.

Employment and housing
There are both on-post and off-post jobs and housing associated with the installation. Civilian job opportunities include day care providers, school teachers, nurses, and custodial workers. There is also a Teen-In-Hire program that helps teens in school obtain jobs.

While housing can be difficult to obtain on-post due to the number of families moving to the area, families are able to stay temporarily at the Fort Drum Inn, cottages, guest house, cabins, or the LeRay Mansion, which all are under the care of Fort Drum Lodging. Soldiers and/or their dependents may also stay at one of many hotels surrounding Fort Drum.

Education
State University of New York North

References

External links
Fort Drum News, Army.mil
Fort Drum news , Watertown Daily Times''
Civilian government employee pay scales for Fort Drum

1908 establishments in New York (state)
Buildings and structures in Jefferson County, New York
Census-designated places in New York (state)
Drum
Drum
Military installations in New York (state)
Populated places in Jefferson County, New York
Drum
Military installations established in 1908